Garis,(), alternative spellings Garsis; Garisme, was a Jewish village in Lower Galilee, situated ca. 4 km. from Sepphoris. The village, although now a ruin, features prominently in the writings of Josephus, where it served temporarily as the place of residence for Josephus during the First Jewish Revolt. In the early stages of the war, Josephus, with the Galileans who were put under his command, cast up a bank around the village, in anticipation of a Roman assault upon the town.

And indeed this sight of the general (Vespasian) brought many to repent at their revolt, and put them all into a consternation; for those that were in Josephus's camp, which was at the city called Garis, not far from Sepphoris, when they heard that the war was come near them, and that the Romans would suddenly fight them hand to hand, dispersed themselves and fled....

Etymology
The Hebrew name of the village is said to have been ʻAris (עריס), having the connotation of "trellised vine;" "grape arbor;" "espalier." The Greek word used in this toponym is Γαρεις, the Gamma said to be of the same ancient usage as found in Greek transliterations of the Hebrew words Gaza = עזה and Gabara = ערב.

Identification
Historical geographers are divided as to the site's location. Klein was the first to identify its Hebrew name with Kefar ʻArīs (כפר עריס) mentioned in the Tosefta (Kelim Baba-Metsia 11:2). Victor Guérin thought that the site of Garis was to be identified with Tell Bedeiwîyeh ("the mound of the Bedouins"), now a large mound with ruins of a small Khân and a well at its foot, located ca.  northwest of Sepphoris. Likewise, the historian and archaeologist, Nikos Kokkinos, surmised that it may have been the ruin Tel Hannaton, being the same place as described by Guérin under its Arabic name, Tell Bedeiwîyeh. William F. Albright held a differing view, thinking that Tell Bedeiwîyeh was the ancient town of Asochis.

Near Kafr Kanna, archaeologists have identified the remains of a Roman-period settlement now known as Karm er-Rās immediately joining the western edge of Kafr Kanna. Karm in Arabic denotes "vineyard," and is derived from the Aramaic word karma, a name which may have been connected with the above-mentioned site of "Garis" = "trellised vine."

Gallery

References

Bibliography

, s.v. Kelim Baba-Metsia 11:1 (published post-mortem) 

, s.v. War 3.6.3 (3.129) (Loeb Classical Library) 
 (Loeb Classical Library

Geography of Israel
Archaeological sites in Israel
First Jewish–Roman War
Ancient Jewish settlements of Galilee
Former populated places in Israel
Lower Galilee
Geography of Palestine (region)
Geography of Northern District (Israel)